The Sperry-Smith House is a historic house in Sparta, Tennessee, U.S..

The house was built in 1880 for Thomas L. Sperry, a dry goods merchant. In 1905, it was purchased by William Templeton Smith, a Judge of the Fifth Circuit Court.

The house was designed in the Italianate and Colonial Revival architectural styles. The original design included a tower, but it was removed and a porch was built instead. It has been listed on the National Register of Historic Places since November 15, 1996.

References

Houses on the National Register of Historic Places in Tennessee
Italianate architecture in Tennessee
Colonial Revival architecture in Tennessee
Houses completed in 1880
Buildings and structures in White County, Tennessee